1422 Strömgrenia, provisional designation , is a stony Florian asteroid from the inner regions of the asteroid belt, approximately 5.5 kilometers in diameter. It was discovered on 23 August 1936, by German astronomer Karl Reinmuth at Heidelberg Observatory in southern Germany, and named after Swedish-Danish astronomer Svante Elis Strömgren.

Classification and orbit 

Strömgrenia is a member of the Flora family, a large group of stony asteroids in the inner main-belt. It orbits the Sun at a distance of 1.9–2.6 AU once every 3 years and 4 months (1,230 days). Its orbit has an eccentricity of 0.17 and an inclination of 3° with respect to the ecliptic.
The body's observation arc however begins with its official discovery observation at Heidelberg in 1936.

Lightcurves 

Two rotational light-curves of Strömgrenia were obtained from photometric observations in the R and S band at the Palomar Transient Factory in April 2009. Light-curve analysis gave a rotation period of 3.5002 and 3.5298 hours with a brightness variation of 0.24 and 0.29 magnitude, respectively.

Diameter, albedo and spectral type 

On the Tholen taxonomy, Strömgrenias spectral class is that of a S-type. According to the survey carried out by NASA's Wide-field Infrared Survey Explorer with its subsequent NEOWISE mission, it measures between 4.64 and 6.03 kilometers in diameter, and its surface has an albedo between 0.209 and 0.40. The Collaborative Asteroid Lightcurve Link, assumes an albedo of 0.24 – derived from the asteroid 8 Flora, the family's principal body and namesake – and calculates a diameter of 5.62 kilometers with an absolute magnitude of 13.42.

Naming 

This minor planet was named in honor of Swedish-Danish astronomer Svante Elis Strömgren (1870–1947), professor of astronomy and director of the Copenhagen University Observatory. Naming citation was first mentioned in The Names of the Minor Planets by Paul Herget in 1955.

References

External links 
 Asteroid Lightcurve Database (LCDB), query form (info )
 Dictionary of Minor Planet Names, Google books
 Asteroids and comets rotation curves, CdR – Observatoire de Genève, Raoul Behrend
 Discovery Circumstances: Numbered Minor Planets (1)-(5000) – Minor Planet Center
 
 

001422
Discoveries by Karl Wilhelm Reinmuth
Named minor planets
001422
19360823